Eco-Earth Globe, sometimes referred to simply as Eco Earth,  is an outdoor sculpture depicting a globe, located in Riverfront Park in Salem, Oregon, in the United States. Completed in 2003, the globe was converted from an acid storage ball with a  diameter that previously belonged to Boise Cascade, a pulp and paper company. Conceived by Mayor Roger Gertenrich, the community art project was funded by community members. According to Oregon Public Broadcasting, the sculpture "was an opportunity for students, and talented volunteers from Salem's art community to collaborate and create hundreds of ceramic icons that represent and teach about different cultures". Mary P. D. Heintzman, a local art teacher and artist, served as the project's art director.

See also
 2003 in art

References

External links
 Acid ball becomes art in Salem park, The Register-Guard (2000)
 Finding India in Salem, Statesman Journal (2012)

2003 establishments in Oregon
2003 sculptures
Outdoor sculptures in Salem, Oregon
Tourist attractions in Salem, Oregon